Okaibe is a coastal village in  Keserwan-Jbeil Governorate in Lebanon, well known for its public sandy beach, fishing port and market. It is a mix of a semi urban lively market street, and three distinctive residential areas situated on elevated ground and overlooking the coast. The river of "Nahr Ibrahim" runs through Okaibe and flows into the sea along the famous sandy beach. Historically a fishing community, with exclusively local residents, Okaibe has recently opened up through small scale real-estate investments that boosted the population growth. The overwhelming majority of the population is Christian and particularly Maronite Catholic.

Geography 
The city has a  coastal front consisting of sandy and rocky beaches along with a remarkable crystal blue water. Moreover, it is renowned for the year-long running river known as " Nahr Ibrahim".

The city is bordered by Nahr Ibrahim and Zaytoun to the north, Bouar to the South, and Al-Nammoura to the east.

The five Communal areas in Okaibe are Al-Mina (Arabic translation for "port"), Boukak El Dine, Kfarchiham, Kmayrze and Jazayer Nahr Ibrahim.

Demographics 
Okaibe has an estimated population of 11,000 (no official census exists), they are predominantly Maronite Catholics.

Religious sites 
Maronite churches are a common site in Okaibe, with 6 churches, 2 monasteries, and 2 chapels. Notably, there is also 1 Hindu temple for the Indian community residing in the area.

References

External links
Aaqaybeh; localiban

Populated places in Keserwan District